Mihai Cătălin Bordeianu (born 18 November 1991) is a Romanian professional footballer who plays as a midfielder for Liga I club CFR Cluj and the Romania national team.

Club career
Bordeianu played 80 matches and scored 3 goals for Botoșani.

International career
He made his Romania national football team debut on 8 September 2019 in a Euro 2020 qualifier against Malta. He started the game and played the whole match.

Career statistics

International

Honours
Dorohoi
Liga III: 2013–14

CFR Cluj
Liga I: 2017–18, 2018–19, 2019–20, 2020–21, 2021–22
Supercupa României: 2018, 2020

References

External links

1991 births
Living people
People from Botoșani County
Romanian footballers
Romanian expatriate footballers
Romania international footballers
Liga I players
Liga II players
Saudi Professional League players
FC Botoșani players
FCM Dorohoi players
CFR Cluj players
Al-Qadsiah FC players
Association football midfielders
Expatriate footballers in Saudi Arabia
Romanian expatriate sportspeople in Saudi Arabia